State Road 128 (SR 128), locally known as San Juan Avenue, is a  east–west state highway in the inner urban Westside neighborhood of Jacksonville, in the U.S. state of Florida. It extends from SR 103 at its western terminus to SR 211 at its eastern terminus.

Route description
SR 128 begins at the three-way intersection of San Juan Avenue and Lane Avenue (SR 103), with SR 128 heading east as a four-lane street with a center turn lane through residential and commercial areas of the Hyde Grove, Hyde Park, Lake Shore, Fairfax, and Ortega neighborhoods of Jacksonville. Three blocks east of Blanding Boulevard, San Juan Avenue crosses a double-tracked railway right at the western end of the intersection with US 17/SR 15 (Roosevelt Boulevard), ending the center lane for SR 128 east of the intersection, and passes by the Roosevelt Square Mall at the southeast end of the intersection. It continues for three blocks as a four-lane highway to SR 128's eastern terminus at Herschel Street (SR 211). San Juan Avenue continues east of Herschel Street under the designation of SR 211 as a two-lane road, heading towards the Ortega Bridge three blocks east of SR 128's eastern terminus.

Major intersections

References

128
128
128